Kim So-jung (Korean: 김소정; born June 2, 1989) is a South Korean singer. She is known as a finalist (Top 11) of Mnet's Superstar K2. She is one of the few in the industry who did not follow the trainee-debut system. She released her first EP, Herrah's on May 21, 2012.

Profile
She was still a student of KAIST when she participated in Superstar K2. She was on leave from studying due to the show but she resumed her student life in 2011 September and has successfully graduated with a degree in data processing.

Discography

Singles

Filmography

TV series

Variety Shows

References

External links
 Official website

1989 births
Living people
K-pop singers
South Korean women pop singers
South Korean female idols
South Korean rhythm and blues singers
Superstar K participants
21st-century South Korean singers
21st-century South Korean women singers
KAIST alumni